Dynamite Smith is a 1924 American silent drama film directed by Ralph Ince and written by C. Gardner Sullivan. The film stars Charles Ray, Bessie Love, and Wallace Beery, and was distributed through Pathé Exchange.

The film is presumed lost.

Plot 
Gladstone Smith (Ray) is a young San Francisco literary editor, who, in his first assignment as a reporter, upsets murderer "Slugger" Rourke (Beery) so much that he must flee to Alaska with his sweetheart Kitty Gray (Logan). Gladstone brings the killer's pregnant wife Violet (Love) with him, so that her child can be born away from the saloons and bars of San Francisco. Slugger pursues them in Alaska, where the baby is born, and Violet dies shortly thereafter. Gladstone is able to trap Slugger in a bear trap. Gladstone lights a dynamite fuse, and changes his mind about using it at the last minute, but it explodes, killing Slugger. Gladstone, Kitty, and the baby are safe.

Cast

Reception 
The film received positive reviews, and was commercially successful.

Grace Kingsley of the Los Angeles Times, Florence Lawrence of the Los Angeles Examiner, and Guy Price of the Los Angeles Herald all gave high praise to Charles Ray for his performance – which universally received rave reviews – and the film served as a comeback vehicle for him. The performances of Beery, Logan, and Love all received positive reviews as well.

References

External links 

 
 
 
 Film stills at silenthollywood.com

1924 drama films
1924 lost films
1924 films
1920s pregnancy films
American black-and-white films
Silent American drama films
American silent feature films
Films directed by Ralph Ince
Films set in Alaska
Films set in San Francisco
Lost American films
Lost drama films
Pathé Exchange films
1920s American films